Events from the year 1345 in Ireland.

Incumbent 
Lord: Edward III

Events 

 February 22 – an assembly is held in Callan, County Kilkenny, under the presidency of Maurice FitzGerald, Earl of Desmond.
 March – Énrí Ó Néill of Clann Aodha Buidhe (Clandeboye, King of Tír Eógain, is deposed by Justiciar d'Ufford and replaced by Aodh Reamhar mac Domhnall Ó Néill, aka Aodh Mór. 
 April 24 – Parliament is held in Dublin
 June 5 – the second Parliament is held in Dublin.
 June 26 – Earl of Desmond attacks Nenagh.
 Justiciar d'Ufford campaigns against Desmond.
 September 30 – Justicier captures Askeaton.
 October 15 – Clann Mhuirchertaigh kills King Toirdhealbach of Connacht; is succeeded by his son Aodh O Conchobhair.
 October 21 – Justiciar captures Castleisland.
 Autumn(?) Earl of Kildare is arrested and imprisoned in Dublin Castle.
 December – at Naas, the Justiciar resumes liberty of Kildare to the crown.

Births

Deaths

References

"The Annals of Ireland by Friar John Clyn", edited and translated with an Introduction, by Bernadette Williams, Four Courts Press, 2007. , pp. 240–244.
"A New History of Ireland VIII: A Chronology of Irish History to 1976", edited by T. W. Moody, F.X. Martin and F.J. Byrne. Oxford, 1982. .
http://www.ucc.ie/celt/published/T100001B/index.html
http://www.ucc.ie/celt/published/T100005C/index.html
http://www.ucc.ie/celt/published/T100010B/index.html

 
1340s in Ireland
Ireland
Years of the 14th century in Ireland